Dariusz Zgutczyński (born 13 February 1965) is a former Polish footballer who played primarily as a midfielder but also had spells playing as a forward.

Biography
Zgutczyński started his career playing in the academy sides of his local team, Mazur Ełk. His first professional move came 1982 when he moved to Bałtyk Gdynia, where he played only once over the course of two seasons. He moved back to Mazur Ełk in 1984, going on to play 46 games and scoring 26 goals for his boyhood club. Zgutczyński returned to Bałtyk Gdynia in 1986, playing with the club for the next six seasons. The team mainly played in the II liga during his spell, but had one year in the I liga, where he played 28 times scoring 3 goals, and one seasons in the third tier, which was Zgutczyński's most successful goal scoring season with 17 goals. Zgutczyński joined Stal Stalowa Wola in 1992, winning promotion to the I liga in 1993, playing a further 31 times in the top tier. He joined Lechia Gdańsk for the 1994–95 season, in what would be his final season before his retirement. His final game was against Pogoń Oleśnica.

Personal life
His brother is former Poland international Andrzej Zgutczyński.

References

1965 births
People from Ełk
Bałtyk Gdynia players
Mazur Ełk players
Stal Stalowa Wola players
Lechia Gdańsk players
Polish footballers
Association football midfielders
Association football forwards
Living people